Kondadeniye Hamuduruwo is an upcoming Sri Lankan Sinhala biographical fantasy film directed by Siritunga Perera and produced by Nalinda Prasad. It stars Ranjan Ramanayake in lead role along with Mahendra Perera and Arjuna Kamalanath. Music composed by Amarasiri Peiris.

The film was influenced by Nandasena Sooriyarachchi's novel Kondadeniye Hamuduruwo Kala Nikum (Wonders of Kondadeniye Thera). Muhurath ceremony was held with the presence of Prime Minister D. M. Jayaratne.

Plot

Cast
 Ranjan Ramanayake as Ven. Kondadeniye Thero
 Mahendra Perera
 Arjuna Kamalanath
 Duleeka Marapana
 Sathischandra Edirisinghe
 Vasanthi Chathurani
 Bimal Jayakodi
 Kumara Thirimadura
 G.R Perera
 Somaweera Gamage
 Thanishka Wimalarathne
 Nipun Lanka
 Nivanka Darshani
 Mangala Madugalle
 Saman Weerasiri
 Mayura Thennakoon
 Ranjith Silva

Foreign artists
 Nathalia Ivanovna
 Alexander Ivanovna
 Elena Adaskova
 Swetlana Sergevana

References

External links
 

Sinhala-language films